Peter Clover (b. Islington, North London, 9 June 1952) is an English children's book author and illustrator best known for the Sheltie the Shetland Pony series, featuring a young girl, Emma, and her shaggy Shetland pony. In addition Peter Clover has created four other short series: Rescue Riders, Hercules, Donkey Diaries, and Little Bridge Farm, along with numerous standalone titles. The Tale of Blackeye Jax is a ghost story about a phantom highwayman, published by Barrington Stoke who specialise in books for reluctant readers. Dead Cool and Dead Cooler are humorous ghost stories also published by Barrington. His inspiration for the Sheltie pony books camefrom when he used to live on Exmoor in Devon. Peter said, "I wanted to spend my time doing the two things I enjoyed most – writing and creating pictures. Illustrated adventure stories for kids seemed like a brilliant idea and I just love it. Being able to create an entire village like Little Applewood and bringing all the characters to life gave me such a buzz."
He is also known for his contemporary abstract paintings and has exhibited in both London and his current home of Mallorca. The Attack of the Killer Frogs is his latest children's horror story, published by A & C Black. With over 70 titles in print throughout UK, USA, France and Germany his latest books are the re-telling of classic tales with ten beautifully illustrated titles including Treasure Island, Robin Hood, Gulliver's Travels, Wind in the Willows, Wizard of Oz, Swan Lake, Rumpelstiltskin and others.

www.peterclover.co.uk

Works
 Drawing Horses and Ponies, Hamlyn Children's (London, England), 1994
 The Best Pony for Me!, Macdonald (Hemel Hempsted, England), 1995
 The Phantom Pony, Corgi (London, England), 1999
 The Storm Pony, Corgie (London, England), 2000
 Dead Cool, Barrington, Stoke (Edinburgh, Scotland), 2003
 Dead Cooler, Barrington Stoke, 2007
 The Tale of Black-Eye Jax, Barrington Stoke, 2009
 Tam O'Shanter, Illustrations only, Barrington Stoke 2009
 Fearless, illustrations only, Barrington Stoke,2009
 The Best Pony For Me, illustrations only, Macdonald Young Books
 The Attack of the Killer Frogs, A & C Black, 2012

Sheltie the Shetland Pony
The Sheltie the Shetland Pony books were published by Puffin Books in the UK. The first seven were also published by Aladdin Paperbacks in the US.
 Sheltie the Shetland Pony, UK: 1996, US: 2000
 Sheltie Saves the Day!, UK: 1996, US: 2000
 Sheltie and the Runaway, UK: 1996, US: 2000
 Sheltie Finds a Friend, UK: 1996, US: 2000
 Sheltie in Danger, UK: 1997, US: 2001
 Sheltie to the Rescue, UK: 1997, US: 2000
 Sheltie Rides to Win, UK: 1998, US: 2001
 Sheltie in Trouble, 1998
 Sheltie and the Saddle Mystery, 1998
 Sheltie Leads the Way, 1998
 Sheltie the Hero, 1998
 Sheltie on Parade, 1999
 Sheltie and the Stray, 1998
 Sheltie the Snow Pony, 1999
 The Big Adventure, 1999
 Sheltie on Patrol, 1999
 Sheltie Goes to School, 1999
 Sheltie Gallops Ahead, 1999
 The Big Show, 1999
 Sheltie: The Big Surprise, 1999
 Sheltie in Double Trouble, 1999
 Sheltie Forever, 1999
 The Big Present, 1999
 Sheltie in Peril, 2000
 Sheltie and the Foal, 2000
 Sheltie: The Big Wish, 2000
 Sheltie by the Sea, 2000
 Sheltie Races On, 2000
 Sheltie at the Funfair, 2001

Rescue Riders
The Rescue Riders books were published by Hodder & Stoughton in 1998.
 Race against Time Fire Alert Ghost PonyHercules
The Hercules books were published by Hodder & Stoughton in 2000.
 New Pup on the Block Operation Snowsearch Treasure HoundDonkey Diaries
The Donkey Diaries books were published by Oxford University Press.
 Donkey Danger, 2001
 Donkey Disaster, 2001
 Donkey Drama, 2001
 Donkey in Distress, 2002

Little Bridge Farm
The Little Bridge Farm books were published by Scholastic Corporation in 2007.
 Oscars New Friends Smudge Finds The Trail Tiger's Great Adventure Dilly Saves The Day Socks Cleans UpClassic Stories
The Classic Stories books were published by Starry Forest Books in 2020.
 Robin Hood Treasure Island The Adventures of Tom Sawyer Rumpelstiltskin Twelve Dancing Princesses The Frog Prince Swan Lake Gulliver's Travels Wizard of Oz Wind in the Willows''

References

Living people
English children's writers
1952 births
Pony books
English male writers